Lucas Morelatto da Cruz (born 25 May 1994) is a Brazilian footballer who currently plays as a midfielder for Chinese Super League club Nantong Zhiyun.

Club career
Morelatto started his career with São Paulo state side Paulista before joining Palmeiras in 2013. After a season with Palmeiras' 'B' team, and time spent on loan with Boa Esporte, Morelatto joined Portuguese side Estoril, and was immediately loaned to LigaPro side Olhanense. After one season with the Leões de Olhão, Morelatto was loaned to third division side C.D. Mafra. On 19 March 2017, he scored a hat-trick in Mafra's 14 to 1 win against Naval 1º de Maio. In March 2023, Morelatto joined Chinese Super League club Nantong Zhiyun.

Career statistics

Club

Notes

References

External links

1994 births
Living people
Brazilian footballers
Brazilian expatriate footballers
Association football midfielders
Sociedade Esportiva Palmeiras players
Boa Esporte Clube players
G.D. Estoril Praia players
S.C. Olhanense players
C.D. Mafra players
U.D. Vilafranquense players
C.D. Fátima players
Iwate Grulla Morioka players
Nantong Zhiyun F.C. players
Liga Portugal 2 players
Campeonato de Portugal (league) players
J3 League players
J2 League players
Chinese Super League players
Brazilian expatriate sportspeople in Portugal
Expatriate footballers in Portugal
Brazilian expatriate sportspeople in Japan
Expatriate footballers in Japan
Brazilian expatriate sportspeople in China
Expatriate footballers in China
Footballers from São Paulo (state)